In mathematics, the Bogomolov conjecture is a conjecture, named after Fedor Bogomolov, in arithmetic geometry about algebraic curves that generalizes the Manin-Mumford conjecture in arithmetic geometry. The conjecture was proved by Emmanuel Ullmo and Shou-Wu Zhang in 1998. A further generalization to general abelian varieties was also proved by Zhang in 1998.

Statement
Let C be an algebraic curve of genus g at least two defined over a number field K, let  denote the algebraic closure of K, fix an embedding of C into its Jacobian variety J, and let  denote the Néron-Tate height on J associated to an ample symmetric divisor. Then there exists an  such that the set

     is finite.

Since  if and only if P is a torsion point, the Bogomolov conjecture generalises the Manin-Mumford conjecture.

Proof
The original Bogomolov conjecture was proved by Emmanuel Ullmo and Shou-Wu Zhang in 1998.

Generalization
In 1998, Zhang proved the following generalization:

Let A be an abelian variety defined over K, and let  be the Néron-Tate height on A associated to an ample symmetric divisor. A subvariety  is called a torsion subvariety if it is the translate of an abelian subvariety of A by a torsion point. If X is not a torsion subvariety, then there is an  such that the set

     is not Zariski dense in X.

References

Other sources

Further reading
 The Manin-Mumford conjecture: a brief survey, by Pavlos Tzermias

Abelian varieties
Diophantine geometry
Conjectures that have been proved